Francis Richter (1854–1926), was an American sportswriter.

Francis Richter may also refer to:

Frank Richter, Jr. (1910–1977), Francis Richter, Canadian politician
Francis Xavier Richter
Francis William Richter (1888–1938), American pianist, organist and composer
Francis Richter, political candidate in United States House of Representatives elections, 1966

See also
Frank Richter (disambiguation)
Charles Francis Richter, creator of the Richter Scale